The 2020 Cork Premier Senior Hurling Championship was the inaugural staging of the Cork Premier Senior Hurling Championship and the 132nd staging overall of a championship for the top-ranking hurling teams in Cork. The draw for the group stage placings took place on 19 November 2019. The championship was scheduled to begin on 17 April 2020, however, it was postponed indefinitely due to the impact of the COVID-19 pandemic on Gaelic games. The championship began on 31 July 2020 and ended on 4 October 2020.

Imokilly were the defending champions, however, they failed to qualify for the knockout stage after being beaten by University College Cork in the divisional final. Ballyhea were relegated from the championship after being beaten in a playoff by Bishopstown.

The final was played on 4 October 2020 at Páirc Uí Chaoimh in Cork, between Blackrock and Glen Rovers, in what was their first meeting in a final in 42 years. Blackrock won the match by 4-26 to 4-18 - the first ever to be settled in extra time - to claim their 33rd championship title overall and a first title since 2002.

Blackrock's Alan Connolly was the championship's top scorer with 5-52.

Format change

On 26 March 2019, three championship proposals were circulated to Cork club delegates. A core element running through all three proposals, put together by the Cork GAA games workgroup, was that there be a group stage of 12 teams followed by a knock-out stage, straight relegation and one team from the divisions/colleges section to enter at the preliminary quarter-final stage. On 2 April 2019, a majority of 136 club delegates voted for Option A which would limit the number of participating club teams to 12 and see one round of games played in April and two more in August – all with county players available.

The championship was scheduled to begin in April 2020, however, it was postponed indefinitely due to the coronavirus pandemic in Ireland. When the championship resumed, time constraints led to a revision of the format, with the play-offs for the second best and third best third placed teams being abolished. The knockout stage was further reduced, with the best-ranking team from the group stage receiving a bye to the semi-finals and the other five qualifying teams joining the divisional/colleges section winner in contesting three quarter-finals.

Team changes

From Championship 
Regraded to the Cork Senior A Hurling Championship

 Ballymartle
 Bandon
 Bride Rovers
 Charleville
 Kanturk
 Killeagh
 Newcestown

Participating teams

Clubs

The club rankings were based on a championship performance 'points' system over the previous four seasons.

Divisions and colleges

Results

Group 1

Table

Results

Group 2

Table

Results

Group 3

Table

Results

Divisional/colleges sections

Semi-final

Final

Relegation playoff

Knock-out stage

Bracket

Quarter-finals

Semi-finals

Final

Championship statistics

Top scorers

Overall

In a single game

Match records

Widest winning margin: 25 points
St. Finbarr's 3-26 - 0-10 Carrigtwohill (Group Stage Round 3)
Most goals in a match: 8
Blackrock 4-26 - 4-18 Glen Rovers (Final)
Most points in a match: 60
Blackrock 3-26 - 0-34 University College Cork (Semi-final)
Most goals by one team in a match: 4
Midleton 4-23 - 1-13 Ballyhea (Group Stage Round 2)
Sarsfields 4-15 - 1-22 Douglas (Group Stage Round 2)
Blackrock 4-15 - 0-18 Bishopstown (Group Stage Round 3)
Blackrock 4-26 - 4-18 Glen Rovers (Final)
Most goals scored by a losing team: 4
Glen Rovers 4-18 - 4-26 Blackrock (Final)
Most points scored by a losing team: 34 
University College Cork 0-34 - 3-26 Blackrock (Semi-final)

Miscellaneous

 On 8 August 2020, Patrick Horgan from the Glen Rovers club became the first player to surpass the cumulative total of 600 points.
 On 12 September 2020, Eoghan Murphy from the Erin's Own club became only the second player ever to surpass the cumulative total of 500 points.
 Blackrock and Glen Rovers met each other in the final for the first time since 1978. 
 It was the first all city final since 1982.
 It was the first final not to feature an East Cork team since 2003
 Blackrock win the title for the first time since 2002..

References

External link

 Cork GAA website

Cork Premier Senior Hurling Championship
Cork
Cork Senior Hurling Championship
Cork Championship